The men's 300 metre team free rifle event was one of five free rifle events of the competitions in the Shooting at the 1900 Summer Olympics events in Paris. It was held from August 3 to August 5, 1900. 30 shooters from 6 nations competed, with five shooters per team. Medals were given for individual high scores in each of the three positions, overall individual high scores, and the scores of the five shooters were summed to give a team score. The top scoring team was Switzerland, led by individual champion Emil Kellenberger. Silver went to Norway, while France took bronze.

Background

This was the first appearance of the men's 300 metre team rifle event, which was held 4 times between 1900 and 1920. The favourite was Switzerland, who had won two of the three world championships (1897 and 1899) to date and taken bronze in the third (1898). France had also reached the podium all three times, winning in 1898.

Competition format

The competition had each shooter fire 120 shots, 40 shots in each of three positions: prone, kneeling, and standing. The target was 1 metre in diameter, with 10 scoring rings; targets were set at a distance of 300 metres. The five team members' scores were then summed. Thus, the maximum score possible was 6000 points. Medals were also awarded for individual three-positions scores. For the only time in Olympic history, medals were awarded for scores in each of the three positions.

Schedule

Results

The scores of the five shooters on each team were summed to give a team score. No further shooting was done. The maximum score was 6000.

References

 International Olympic Committee medal winners database
 De Wael, Herman. Herman's Full Olympians: "Shooting 1900". Accessed 3 March 2006.
 

Men's rifle military, team
Men's 300m team

ca:Tir als Jocs Olímpics d'estiu de 1900 - Rifle militar, tres posicions
hu:1900. évi nyári olimpiai játékok (sportlövészet - férfi hadipuska, összetett)